Clement Leroy "Butch" Otter (born May 3, 1942) is an American businessman and politician who served as the 32nd governor of Idaho from 2007 to 2019. A member of the Republican Party, he was elected in 2006, and reelected in 2010, and 2014. Otter served as lieutenant governor from 1987 to 2001 and in U.S. Congress from the first district from 2001 to 2007.

Early life, education and business career (1942–1972)
Born in Caldwell, Idaho into a small Roman Catholic family of limited means, his parents were Regina Mary ( Buser) and Joseph Bernard Otter. His father was a journeyman electrician, and the family lived in many rural locations in the Midwest and West during his youth, attending fifteen different schools.

His nickname "Butch" was the result of a few schoolyard fights which resulted in minor bruises; Catholic nuns had initially nicknamed him "Clem" after a character in the Red Skelton Show. He graduated from St. Teresa's Academy (predecessor of Bishop Kelly High School) in Boise in 1962. Otter graduated from high school at age twenty – a childhood accident involving gasoline severely burned his younger brother and forced Otter to take a year off. He worked throughout high school as a janitor, theater usher, and lawn boy.

Otter briefly attended St. Martin's College in Lacey, Washington, returned to Idaho and attended Boise Junior College, then earned his B.A. in political science from the College of Idaho in 1967. He was the only member of his family to graduate from college, and made the dean's list in his last term. He served in the Idaho Army National Guard's 116th Armored Cavalry from 1968 to 1973.

Otter's business experience includes thirty years with Simplot International, an agribusiness corporation founded by his then father-in-law, J.R. Simplot. He started at a low-level position and eventually rose to the company's presidency.

Early political career (1972–1986)

Idaho legislature
His first bid for elective office was in 1972; he won a seat in the state legislature from Canyon County, and was re-elected to the House in 1974 serving until 1976.

1978 gubernatorial election

In January 1977, incumbent Democratic Governor Cecil Andrus was appointed U.S. Secretary of Interior under President Jimmy Carter. Lieutenant governor John Evans, a Democrat, succeeded Andrus and Otter announced in June his intention to run for governor  In the six-man Republican primary in August, Otter ranked a close third with 26.0% of the vote. Allan Larsen, the House Speaker from Blackfoot, won the nomination with 28.7% of the vote, followed by Vern Ravenscroft of Tuttle, 

The nominees of both parties were Mormon, marking the first time in state history one would be elected governor. Incumbent Evans was unopposed in the Democratic primary and won the general election in November with nearly sixty percent of the vote; it was the third of six consecutive victories by Democrats.

State politics
After losing the gubernatorial primary, he was on the Idaho Republican Party Central Committee and was Chairman of the Canyon County Republican Party.

Reagan administration
After Ronald Reagan won the presidency in 1980, he appointed Otter to the administration's Task Force on International Private Enterprise, the World Bank's Agricultural Advisory Committee, and the Center for International Private Enterprise.

Lieutenant governor (1987–2001)
In 1986, Otter returned to Idaho politics and was elected lieutenant governor, and reelected in 1990, 1994, and 1998. He served under three different governors, Democrat Cecil Andrus, and Republicans Phil Batt and Dirk Kempthorne. In 1991, when the Idaho Senate was evenly divided between 21 Republicans and 21 Democrats, Otter's tie-breaking votes kept the body under GOP control. Midway through his fourth term in 2001 (14 years), Otter resigned to take his congressional seat in Washington, D.C.; he is the longest-serving lieutenant governor in Idaho history.

U.S. House of Representatives (2001–2007)

Elections
Congresswoman Helen Chenoweth-Hage of the First District had promised to serve only three terms in the House when first elected in the Republican wave of 1994, and kept that pledge in 2000 even after calling term limits bad policy.

Otter entered the Republican primary, and immediately became the favorite due to his name recognition as lieutenant governor. He won handily, and breezed to victory in November, and was re-elected in 2002 and 2004.

Tenure
In Congress, Otter was largely conservative with a slight libertarian streak, as reflected in his opposition to the Patriot Act. He was one of three Republicans (along with Bob Ney of Ohio and Ron Paul of Texas) to vote against the Act in 2001.

He since stated that "much of the USA PATRIOT Act is needed to help protect us in a dangerous age of stateless zealots and mindless violence". Otter was also very critical of the Bush Administration's Terrorist Surveillance Program concerning communications to those outside the United States. He served as a deputy majority whip for most of his time in Congress.

Abortion
Otter is anti-abortion and has voted to ban federal funding of abortions and opposes so-called "partial-birth abortions". He also supports parental consent laws for minors who seek an abortion.

LGBT rights
He supports a constitutional amendment defining marriage as between "one man and one woman."

Gun laws
He has been a strong advocate for Second Amendment rights and opposes federal restrictions on gun sales.

Economy
On economic issues, he has voted for a 2001 bankruptcy overhaul requiring partial debt repayment. He supports a balanced budget amendment to the US Constitution and supports broad-based tax cuts including eliminating the estate and marriage taxes. He has supported expanding free-trade agreements with nations such as Singapore and Chile.

Health care
He has voted for medical malpractice and tort reform. He has voted to allow importation of prescription drugs and has supported small business associations to reduce health insurance costs via collaborative efforts.

Foreign Policy
Otter voted to authorize the 2003 invasion of Iraq.

Committee assignments
U.S. House Committee on Resources
U.S. House Committee on Transportation and Infrastructure
U.S. House Committee on Government Reform
U.S. House Committee on Energy and Commerce

Leadership in International Trade
Otter published an article in The Ripon Forum magazine. In the article, Otter discussed that he had led many trade missions to Asia-Pacific countries, fostering relationships with companies in Seoul, Taipei, Taiwan and Ho Chi Minh City. Otter brought a delegation to Taiwan that resulted in Idaho's Micron Technology becoming Taiwan's largest direct U.S. investor.

Governor of Idaho (2007–2019)

2006 election

In December 2005, Otter announced his candidacy for the gubernatorial seat in 2006. Otter won the May Republican primary with 70% of the vote, defeating three opponents

In the general election, he faced Democrat Jerry Brady in the November 7 general election. Brady, the former publisher of The Post Register in Idaho Falls, had run for governor in 2002, losing to incumbent Republican Governor Dirk Kempthorne. Otter was initially considered an overwhelming favorite, given his popularity and Idaho's strong Republican lean. However, the race was far closer than expected in the last weeks of the campaign. A poll conducted for the Idaho Statesman and Boise ABC affiliate KIVI showed Otter ahead of Brady by only a single point– a statistical dead heat. According to the Statesman, it was the first time in over a decade that the governor's race has not already been decided 10 days prior to the election.

State Republican Party chairman Kirk Sullivan told the paper that the race appeared to be closer than normal because of a strong national trend against the Republicans. Otter pulled away in the final week, and won the election 53%–44%, the closest gubernatorial race since 1994.

First term
Otter has recommended an increase in Idaho state educational funding by $1.36 billion as well as expanding needs-based scholarships for college-bound students. Otter supports expanding offshore oil drilling and supports tax incentives for development of alternative fuels. He has stated that the US should set a goal of 25% renewable energy by 2025.

On January 11, 2007, Otter announced his support for a "gray wolf kill," in which all but 100 of Idaho's recently recovered population would be eradicated, pending the forthcoming U.S. Fish and Wildlife Service removal of the wolves' federal protections under the Endangered Species Act. Otter even remarked that he would be first in line to purchase a tag to kill one of the animals. This position drew criticism from many Western environmental and animal advocate groups, including Priscilla Feral, president of Friends of Animals who called for a boycott of potatoes from Idaho.

In the summer of 2007, actress Dawn Wells, the original Mary Ann from Gilligan's Island Wells Governor Butch Otter with the Idaho Visionary Award for the work he had done supporting Idaho filmmakers at the SpudFest Family Film and Music Festival that she founded in Driggs, Idaho.

2010 election

In the Republican primary, he had five opponents file against him. He won re-nomination with just 55% of the vote. In the general election, he defeated Democratic nominee Keith Allred 59%–33%.

Second term
He was sworn into his second term on January 7, 2011. In the first State of the State in his second term, he proposed the elimination of teacher tenure, becoming one of the most aggressive governors in the country when it comes to education reform. The Stateline explained that the "Idaho plan is perhaps the most far-reaching effort to use teachers' rights and performance as part of a bid to revamp a state's entire educational process." Critics say that roughly 770 teaching positions would be eliminated and teacher contracts would have to be renegotiated every year, in which bargaining would cover only pay and benefits. In March 2011, Otter signed two bills into law, one limits the ability of teachers to collectively bargain and eliminates tenure for new teachers. The other allows school districts to pay teachers based on their performance. The "Luna laws" (named after the state's superintendent of education) were later overturned in three state referendums in 2012.

In April 2011, Otter issued an executive order prohibiting Idaho state agencies from implementing the federal Patient Protection and Affordable Care Act.

In 2013, the Corrections Corporation of America (CCA) confirmed that an internal review showed the corporation had falsified records involving about 4,800 employee hours over a period of seven months, at its Idaho State Correctional Center. In 2014, a subsequent KPMG audit showed the actual overbilling was for over 26,000 hours. Otter ordered Idaho State Police to investigate to see if criminal charges should be brought. Otter had received a total of $20,000 in campaign contributions from employees of the company since 2003. In March, the state announced that the FBI was taking over the investigation, as well as investigating CCA operations in other states. In January 2014, Otter announced that the state would take back the operations of the prison.

In May 2016, CCA, which had by then changed its name to CoreCivic, was found in contempt of court for having failed to comply with a court order regarding the Idaho State Correctional Institution. In an apparent attempt to increase profits, the company had been assigning too few staff to the prison and it submitted false staffing reports in order to appear to be in compliance.

In March 2014 Otter established the "Wolf Control Fund and State Board" which continues his policy of exterminating wolves in Idaho.

2014 election

In November 2014, Otter was elected to a third consecutive term as governor.

Third term
Senate Bill 1146a, which would have legalized CBD oil for persons with severe epilepsy, passed the Idaho Legislature following "lengthy and emotional" hearings, but was vetoed by Otter in April 2015.

In his veto, Otter stated:

For the United States presidential election in 2016 Otter endorsed fellow Republican John Kasich.

In May 2016, CCA, which had changed its name to CoreCivic, was found in contempt of court for having failed to comply with a court order regarding the Idaho State Correctional Institution. In an apparent attempt to increase profits, the company had been assigning too few staff to the prison. They submitted false staffing reports to appear to be in compliance.

In July 2017, Texas Attorney General Ken Paxton led a group of Republican Attorneys General from nine other states, and also including Otter, in threatening the Donald Trump administration that they would litigate if the president did not terminate the Deferred Action for Childhood Arrivals policy that had been put into place by president Barack Obama. Tennessee Attorney General Herbert Slatery subsequently reversed his position and withdrew his participation from the proposed suit on August 31. Slatery went further to urge passage of the DREAM Act.

On January 5, 2019, the State Central Committee of the Idaho Republican Party passed a resolution condemning and censuring Otter ultimately over endorsing an independent candidate over a candidate nominated in the previous May primary.

Personal life

In 1964, Otter married Gay Simplot (b. 1945), the sister of Scott Simplot and only daughter of J. R. Simplot. After 28 years of marriage, the couple amicably divorced in 1992. The marriage was later annulled by the Catholic Church.

In 2006, Otter married his longtime girlfriend Lori Easley (born 1967), a former Miss Idaho USA, in Meridian on August 18.

Drunk driving arrest
In August 1992, Otter was pulled over on Interstate 84 near Meridian for suspicion of driving under the influence. He said the arresting officer observed him swerving as he was reaching for his cowboy hat, which had been blown off by the wind in his open car. Otter offered several explanations for failing the field sobriety test including: his stocking feet were stung by weeds and gravel, he had run eight miles (13 km) and his knee hurt, he was hungry, and that he had soaked his chewing tobacco in Jack Daniel's. A jury convicted Otter in March 1993, and he was sentenced to 72 hours of community service and 16 hours at an alcohol treatment program, fined $700, and had his license revoked.

He publicly admitted the incident could have ended his political career; it likely forced him to abandon an anticipated run for governor in 1994 and instead seek re-election for lieutenant governor. Phil Batt won the gubernatorial election for the first Republican victory in 28 years.

Electoral history

References

External links
 Governor C. L. “Butch” Otter official government website
 Butch Otter for Governor 
 
 

|-

|-

|-

|-

|-

1942 births
20th-century American businesspeople
21st-century American politicians
American business executives
Businesspeople in agriculture
Catholics from Idaho
College of Idaho alumni
Republican Party governors of Idaho
Idaho National Guard personnel
Lieutenant Governors of Idaho
Living people
Republican Party members of the Idaho House of Representatives
People from Boise, Idaho
People from Caldwell, Idaho
Republican Party members of the United States House of Representatives from Idaho
Boise State University alumni
Idaho politicians convicted of crimes